Petrella Liri is a frazione of Cappadocia in the Province of L'Aquila, in the Abruzzo, region of Italy.

Frazioni of Cappadocia, Abruzzo